The Swan House and Vita Spring Pavilion are located in Beaver Dam, Wisconsin.

History
The pavilion sits over a spring that was the focal point of a resort called Vita Park. Opened by Dr. George E. Swan, the resort drew visitors from around the country, while local residents were allowed access free of charge. In 1906, the property was bought by the city and in 1916, it became Swan Park. The former residence of Swan and his wife is located nearby.

The site was listed on the National Register of Historic Places in 1980 and on the State Register of Historic Places in 1989.

References

Houses on the National Register of Historic Places in Wisconsin
National Register of Historic Places in Dodge County, Wisconsin
Houses in Dodge County, Wisconsin
Pavilions in the United States
Queen Anne architecture in Wisconsin
Houses completed in 1899
Beaver Dam, Wisconsin
Springs of Wisconsin